Lev! is a  long glass artwork in the pedestrian and bicycle tunnel between the Railway Station Square in central Umeå and Haga District in Sweden. The display has 16 audio channels and four of these are interactive. It was inaugurated on 17 November 2012 in conjunction with the festival Autumn Light and the reopening of Umeå Central Station.

More images

References

Glass works of art
Public art in Umeå
Tourist attractions in Umeå